Tanzania has a wide range of energy resources in abundance, which are not yet fully exploited. These include; wood fuel, other biomass fuels, hydropower, natural gas, coal, wind, geothermal, uranium and solar.

Renewable energy 
Tanzania has a large untapped renewable energy potential. Of the country’s total generation capacity, close to 80% of Tanzania electricity comes from renewable energy, with natural gas contributing 892.72MW and Hydro electric power 573.70MW of the total 1,601.84 megawatts, as of April 2020. According to the government of Tanzania, generation projects in the pipeline include: (a) Ruhudji (358MW), Kakono (87MW), Rumakali (222MW), Malagarasi (45MW), Kikonge (300MW), Kinyerezi I Extension (185MW) and Mtwara (300MW).

Solar power is widely used in rural areas, with 65 percent of rural households having access to solar energy sources.

Electricity
As of July 2020, Tanzania had installed grid generation capacity of 1,601.84 megawatts. The table below illustrates the generation mix as of then, in the Tanzanian national grid.

*Note 1: Totals are slightly off due to rounding.
*Note 2: The hydroelectric figures exclude 2,115 MW from Julius Nyerere Hydropower Station and 50 MW from Malagarasi Hydroelectric Power Station, both still under development.

Biomass constitutes over 90 percent of the country's primary energy consumption. This accounts for deforestation of  annually. Reforestation restores only about 25 percent of that annually. As of April 2020, 73.2 percent of Tanzania's urban areas and 24.5 percent of her rural areas have access to electricity.

The electrical supply varies, particularly when droughts disrupt hydropower electric generation; rolling blackouts are implemented as necessary. Nearly a quarter of electricity generated is lost because of poor transmission infrastructure. The unreliability of the electrical supply has hindered the development of Tanzanian industry.

Dar es Salaam
Dar es Salaam is a key area in the supply chain of petroleum products across Tanzania and as an emerging industrial zone, the port attracts major international companies. A major supplier of petroleum products in the region is Dalbit Petroleum who rely on the port as part of their operations and have developed a well-organized supply chain through the port since the company’s regional inception in 2007.

Way forward
In 2016, the Energy Access Situation Survey indicated that "32.8 percent of the households in the Tanzania Mainland were connected to electricity", as of that year. Demand for connection was growing at 10 to 15 percent annually.

A major objective was achieved in 2015, when the country phased out emergency generation centers using "high-cost" liquid fossil fuels. The completion of the Mtwara–Dar es Salaam Natural Gas Pipeline, with commissioning in October that year ensures a constant supply of natural gas to meet generation requirements of the large gas power stations in the country's largest city. The Tanzanian government aims to reach generation capacity of at least 5,000 megawatts in the medium term and 10,000 megawatts in the long term.

While the country's offshore gas reserves discovered by Shell and Equinor have remained undeveloped for many years, new political leadership since 2021 has given hope that Tanzania may become an exporter of LNG by 2030. As of 2022, negotiations were back on the table to develop the 10 million tonnes per annum  Tanzania Liquefied Natural Gas Terminal, with final investment decision (FID), expected in 2025. The projected cost is US$30 billion.

See also
Ministry of Energy and Minerals
Tanzania Atomic Energy Commission
Tanzania Electric Supply Company Limited
List of power stations in Tanzania

References

External links
 Increasing Electricity Access in Tanzania to Reduce Poverty As of 16 December 2016.

 
Environment of Tanzania
Politics of Tanzania